The Lookout Mountain SkyCycle, also marketed as The Freedom Machine, is an American ultralight trike that was designed by Matt Taber, produced by Lookout Mountain Flight Park of Rising Fawn, Georgia and introduced in 1997. The aircraft was supplied as a kit for amateur construction and also as plans.

Design and development
The SkyCycle was designed to be a minimalist nanotrike, capable of using the builder's existing hang glider wing. It features a cable-braced hang glider high-wing, weight-shift controls, a single-seat open cockpit, tricycle landing gear and a single engine in pusher configuration.

The aircraft is made from bolted-together aluminum tubing, with its double-surface Pulse 11 wing covered in Dacron sailcloth. Its  span wing is supported by a single tube-type kingpost and uses an "A" frame control bar. The standard engine supplied by the factory was the Zenoah G-25, single cylinder, two-stroke, air-cooled aircraft engine

The SkyCycle was intended to be constructed by people who were already hang glider pilots and, in fact, the manufacturer is a large hang gliding school. By keeping the weight down to a minimum the designer envisioned that the builder could use his or her existing hang glider wing for the aircraft. The manufacturer also supplied the Pulse 11 wing for those builders who did not own a hang glider wing. In 2005 the complete aircraft sold for US$7995 with plans selling for US$75. A total of 225 examples had been completed and flown by February 2005.

The aircraft could be quickly dismantled for ground transportation or storage.

Specifications (Skycycle)

See also

References

External links
Photo of SkyCycle

1990s United States ultralight aircraft
Homebuilt aircraft
Lookout Mountain
Single-engined pusher aircraft
Ultralight trikes